Schistura sigillata is a species of ray-finned fish, a stone loach, in the genus Schistura from Laos.

References

S
Fish described in 2000